Boyz on Fire is Taiwanese Mandopop boyband SpeXial's fourth Mandarin studio album. The press conference of this album was held on July 19. The album was preordered from July 20 (Fire Edition, Pink Edition), and then released on August 12 (Shining Edition). The title track is the theme song of the idol drama KO ONE: RE-MEMBER. The second promotional single is "When Grief Strikes".

The title track "Boyz on Fire" is listed at number 59 on Hit Fm Taiwan's Hit Fm Annual Top 100 Singles Chart (Hit-Fm年度百首單曲) for 2016. 
The "Fire Edition" comes with a 96-page photobook, while the "Pink Edition" includes a 32-page photobook. The "Shining Edition" includes a 36-page photo lyric book.
The album was ranked No. 1 in Five Top Ranking (week 33 of year 2016) in the first week after release.

Track listing

Music videos

References

External links
 SpeXial 第四張正規專輯《Boyz on Fire》烈火版｜華納線上音樂雜誌
 SpeXial 第四張正規專輯《Boyz on Fire》粉紅版｜華納線上音樂雜誌
 SpeXial 第四張正規專輯《Boyz on Fire》閃亮版｜華納線上音樂雜誌

2016 albums
SpeXial albums